The 1954–55 1re série season was the 34th season of the 1re série, the top level of ice hockey in France. Chamonix Hockey Club won their 15th league title.

Final ranking
 1st place: Chamonix Hockey Club
 2nd place: Paris Université Club
 3rd place: CSG Paris
 4th place: Club des patineurs lyonnais
 5th place: Ours de Villard-de-Lans
 6th place: Diables Rouges de Briançon
 7th place: US Métro
 8th place: Radio Tout Sport
 9th place: Gap Hockey Club
 10th place: Sporting Hockey Club Saint Gervais
 11th place ?
 12th place: ?
 13th place: ASPP Paris
 14th place: Club des Sports de Megève
 15th place: Athletic Club de Boulogne-Billancourt
 16th place: ?
 17th place: ? 
 18th place: Central HC

External links
List of French champions on hockeyarchives.info

Fra
1954–55 in French ice hockey
Ligue Magnus seasons